Moonan may refer to:

Moonan Brook, a mostly perennial stream of the Hunter River catchment, is located in the Hunter region of New South Wales, Australia
Moonan Flat, a village in the Upper Hunter Shire local government area, Upper Upper Hunter Region of New South Wales, Australia
John Moonan Fitzgerald (1923–2008), American politician and jurist